In enzymology, an adenosine nucleosidase is an enzyme that catalyzes the chemical reaction

adenosine + H2O  D-ribose + adenine

Thus, the two substrates of this enzyme are adenosine and H2O, whereas its two products are D-ribose and adenine.

This enzyme belongs to the family of hydrolases, specifically those glycosylases that hydrolyse N-glycosyl compounds.  The systematic name of this enzyme class is adenosine ribohydrolase. Other names in common use include adenosinase, N-ribosyladenine ribohydrolase, adenosine hydrolase, and ANase.  This enzyme participates in purine metabolism.

References

 

EC 3.2.2
Enzymes of unknown structure